Greenlawn is a hamlet and census-designated place (CDP) in Suffolk County, New York, United States. Located on Long Island in the Town of Huntington, the population was 13,742 at the 2010 census. Students primarily attend the Harborfields Central School District.

History
Originally known as Old Fields, it became known by the name Greenlawn with the coming of the Long Island Rail Road in 1870 or 1871. The LIRR chose the name Greenlawn for its station, apparently to project an idyllic rural/suburban image and foster resort travel to the beaches in Centerport. Greenlawn was well known for its pickle production during the 19th century as well as, to a lesser degree, potato and cabbage farms; the principal commodity, pickles, is still celebrated by the annual Pickle Festival, held by the local Greenlawn-Centerport Historical Association at the John Gardiner Farm. The Gardiner family was the first to make a name for themselves as pickle farmers in the region but a former enslaved man, Samuel Ballton, earned the moniker "The Pickle King" for becoming a prolific pickle farmer in Greenlawn in the early 1900s.

Geography
Greenlawn is located at  (40.857648, -73.365932).

Demographics

Demographics of the CDP
As of the census of 2010, there were 13,742 people, 4,560 households, and 3,345 families residing in the CDP. The population density was 3,714.1 per square mile (1,446.5/km2). There were 4,722 housing units at an average density of 1,276.2/sq mi (497.1/km2). The racial makeup of the CDP was 74.0% White, 13.9% African American, 0.4% Native American, 4.1% Asian, 0.01% Pacific Islander, 4.9% some other race, and 2.7% from two or more races. Hispanic or Latino of any race were 12.5% of the population.

There were 4,560 households, out of which 39.6% had children under the age of 18 living with them, 57.8% were headed by married couples living together, 11.9% had a female householder with no husband present, and 26.6% were non-families. 22.4% of all households were made up of individuals, and 13.8% were someone living alone who was 65 years of age or older. The average household size was 2.94 and the average family size was 3.45.

In the CDP, the population was spread out, with 25.6% under the age of 18, 7.0% from 18 to 24, 22.7% from 25 to 44, 28.2% from 45 to 64, and 16.6% who were 65 years of age or older. The median age was 41.9 years. For every 100 females, there were 92.4 males. For every 100 females age 18 and over, there were 87.8 males.

For the period 2007–2011, the median annual income for a household in the CDP was $92,664, and the median income for a family was $116,768. Males had a median income of $73,659 versus $59,107 for females. The per capita income for the CDP was $40,484. About 2.1% of families and 3.5% of the population were below the poverty line, including 0.8% of those under age 18 and 9.6% of those age 65 or over.

In popular culture

Films
 The independent film Have Yourself a Merry Little Christmas was filmed in Greenlawn in late 2005 and early 2006.
 The independent film L.I.E. had shots filmed in Harborfields High School.

Trivia
 Greenlawn is well known for its annual pickle festival.
 Members of the Greenlawn Fire Department hold an annual Greenlawn Firemans Fair on Labor Day weekend. First held in 1906, it is known as the oldest and largest in New York state.

Notable people
 The pop singer Mariah Carey grew up in Greenlawn. She attended, and graduated from Harborfields High School.
 Jeff Hawkins, born in 1957 in Huntington, New York, and who graduated from Harborfields High School in 1975, is the founder of Palm Computing where he invented the Palm Pilot, and Handspring where he invented the Treo.
 Fay Kellogg, called the foremost woman architect in the US, summered on a farm that she owned in Greenlawn. She also designed and supervised the building of Greenlawn's post office east of Broadway behind the train station in 1911.
 Christine Frederick, home economist and proponent of Taylorism, performed household experiments from her house on Cuba Hill Road.
 The late Karl Linnas, surveyor and alleged war criminal and Nazi collaborator in Nazi-occupied Soviet Estonia during World War II.
 The late Charles Ludlam, actor, playwright and founder of the Theater of the Ridiculous in New York City, grew up in Greenlawn and graduated from Harborfields High School.
Sara Whalen (born 1976), Olympic medalist soccer player
 Clark Gillies,Hockey Hall of Famer, Four time Stanley Cup Champion (1979-1983), and former Captain on the New York Islanders resided in Greenlawn until his death in January 21,2022. 

Historical Sites

 John Gardiner Farm - Original house was built in the 1750s. The property is now owned by the Greenlawn-Centerport Historical Association.

References

External links

 Greenlawn-Centerport Historical Association

Huntington, New York
Census-designated places in New York (state)
Hamlets in New York (state)
Census-designated places in Suffolk County, New York
Hamlets in Suffolk County, New York